Niloy Alamgir  is a Bangladeshi model and actor. He is the champion in Fair & Lovely Super Hero Super Heroine contest in 2009 - organized by BFDC, Market Access Group & NTV.

Career
Alamgir's career in film and TV media after winning Super Hero Super Heroine contest in 2009. He made his film debut in 2011 with Baily Road directed by Masood Kayenat. His movie Olpo Olpo Premer Golpo was released 29 August 2014.

He has done TV commercials: Keya white plus detergent powder, Banglalink desh5, Ice cool soap, Singer etc.

Personal life 
Niloy was born on 20 August 1984 in Dhaka. His father is Awlad Hossain and his mother is Asma Hossain. He married model and actress Anika Kabir Shokh on 7 January 2016 but divorced on 17 July 2017. On July 7, 2021, he married Tasnuva Tabassum Hridi.

Filmography

Television

TV films

TV series

Web series

Short films

References

External links
 

Living people
21st-century Bangladeshi male actors
Bangladeshi male models
Bangladeshi male film actors
Bangladeshi male television actors
1984 births